30 Below Zero is a 1926 American drama film directed by Robert P. Kerr and Lambert Hillyer and written by John Stone. The film stars Buck Jones, Eva Novak, Paul Panzer, E. J. Ratcliffe, Frank Butler and Harry Woods. The film was released on October 31, 1926, by Fox Film Corporation.

Cast        
Buck Jones as Don Hathaway Jr.
Eva Novak as Ann Ralston
Paul Panzer as Fighting Bill Ralston
E. J. Ratcliffe as Don Hathaway Sr.
Frank Butler as Professor Amos Hopkins
Harry Woods as Cavender
Fred Walton as Butler
Henry Murdock as Halfbreed Indian
Vincente Howard as Bootlegger

References

External links
 

1926 films
1920s English-language films
Silent American drama films
1926 drama films
Fox Film films
Films directed by Robert P. Kerr
Films directed by Lambert Hillyer
American silent feature films
American black-and-white films
1920s American films